Roger Läubli (born 25 October 1951) is a Swiss retired football goalkeeper and later manager.

References

1951 births
Living people
Swiss men's footballers
Association football goalkeepers
FC La Chaux-de-Fonds players
Neuchâtel Xamax FCS players
Swiss Super League players
Swiss football managers
FC La Chaux-de-Fonds managers
SR Delémont managers
BSC Young Boys managers